Gabriel Benoist (11 July 1891 – 27 October 1964) was a French writer in the Cauchois dialect of the Norman language. He is best known for the Thanase Pequeu stories of which three volumes were published in the 1930s.

He was born at Gournay-en-Bray in the Pays de Caux region of the Seine-Maritime department of Normandy.

He was the second eldest of a family of eleven children. He is buried at Yvetot.

Works
 Thanase Péqueu (February 1, 1932)
 Le mariage de Thanase Péqueu
 Les Histouères de Thanase Péqueu, (1932–1937, in Le Journal de Rouen).

Norman-language writers
20th-century French non-fiction writers
20th-century French male writers
1891 births
1964 deaths